All Kinds of Everything is a studio album by American country singer–songwriter Hank Locklin. It was released in 1979 via Top Spin Records and contained 12 tracks of new material. It contained mostly re-recordings of songs Locklin had previously recorded. The album was issued to international markets outside of his home market: the United States.

Background, content and release
Hank Locklin had major hits in the 1950s and 1960s with songs like "Send Me the Pillow You Dream On" and "Please Help Me, I'm Falling." These songs (among others) gained notable international success, especially in Europe. After Locklin's commercial success declined in the 1970s, he began touring more overseas. He remained a popular concert attraction in Ireland specifically.

All Kinds of Everything was Locklin's second studio recording tailored specifically for the Irish market. In 1978, he had released his first international album. The project was recorded at Fireside Studios in Nashville, Tennessee and was produced by country artist Porter Wagoner. The record contained 12 tracks of material. It included a remake of Locklin's self-penned tune, "The Upper Room". The album's remaining songs were also re-recordings of titles Locklin had previously cut for RCA Victor Recordings during his career with them. This included "Day of Autumn Gold" as well as "Time and Eternity."

All Kinds of Everything was released in 1979 on Top Spin Records, an Irish record label which had issued his previous album. The project was issued as a vinyl LP, containing six songs on each side of the record. In later decades, the album would be re-issued for digital and streaming sites. The album included one single release. Locklin's re-recording of "The Upper Room" was first released as a single on the Top Spin label in 1978.

Track listing

Vinyl version

Digital version

Personnel
All credits are adapted from the liner notes of All Kinds of Everything.

Musical personnel
 Joe Chrisman – Drums
 Ronald Drake – Background vocals
 Bobby Dyson – Guitar
 Beckie Foster – Background vocals
 Allen Henson – Background vocals
 Dave Kirby – Guitar
 Hank Locklin – Lead vocals
 Laverna Moore – Background vocals
 Weldon Myrick – Steel guitar
 Fred Newell – Guitar
 Hargus "Pig" Robbins – Piano

Technical personnel
 Tom Pick – Engineer
 Roy Shockley – Engineer
 Porter Wagoner – Producer

Release history

References

1979 albums
Hank Locklin albums